Devon Manchester (born 11 November 1989) is a New Zealand field hockey player. He represented his country at the 2016 Summer Olympics in Rio de Janeiro, where the men's team came seventh.

References

External links
 
 
 

1989 births
Living people
Field hockey players from Auckland
Olympic field hockey players of New Zealand
New Zealand male field hockey players
Field hockey players at the 2016 Summer Olympics
Commonwealth Games silver medallists for New Zealand
Field hockey players at the 2018 Commonwealth Games
Commonwealth Games medallists in field hockey
2014 Men's Hockey World Cup players
20th-century New Zealand people
21st-century New Zealand people
Medallists at the 2018 Commonwealth Games